, also known as , is a figure in Japanese mythology, the third and youngest son of  and the blossom princess . He is one of the ancestors of the Emperors of Japan as the grandfather of Emperor Jimmu.

Mythology
Hoori's legend is told in both the Kojiki and the Nihon Shoki. Hoori was a hunter, and he had an argument with his brother Hoderi, a fisherman, over a fish-hook that Hoori had forced his elder brother to lend him and had lost. Hoderi claimed that Hoori should give back the fish-hook, for he refused to accept another one (due to the belief that each tool is animated and hence unique). Hoori then descended to the bottom of the sea to search, but was unable to find it. Instead, he found Toyotama-hime, the daughter of the sea god, Ryūjin. The sea god helped Hoori find Hoderi's lost hook, and Hoori later married Toyotama-hime.

Hoori lived with his wife in a palace under the sea for three years, but after that Hoori became home-sick and wished to return to his own country. His brother forgave him after he returned the hook, and Toyotama-hime gave birth to a son named Ugayafukiaezu. During the time when Toyotama-hime was giving birth to her child, she had Hoori swear not to attempt to see her real figure. But he broke his promise and discovered her true form was a dragon (specifically a wani). She was ashamed and returned to her father, never to return. Ugayafukiaezu married Toyotama-hime's sister, Tamayori-hime, who brought him up, and she gave birth to Emperor Jimmu, who was the first Emperor of Japan. Hoori reigned in Takachiho, Hyūga Province for 560 years.

Hoori is often associated with both his parents and his wife. He is worshiped mainly as a god of cereals or grain. In Japanese mythology, it was said that the  part of his name meant fire, but etymologically, it is a different character pronounced , which refers to crops, particularly rice.  indicates a crop that is so rich, it bends under its own weight. Another name for him, Hohodemi, means many harvests.

Genealogy
Hoori is part of the three generations of Hyuga, a period between Tenson kōrin and Jimmu's Eastern Expedition.

References

External links

Hoderi and Hoori from Myths and Legends of Japan by F. Hadland Davis. 

Japanese gods
Shinto kami
Agricultural gods
Food deities